was a Japanese noble woman from the Sengoku period. She was the half-sister of Japanese warlord Uesugi Kenshin. She was also the mother of Uesugi Kagekatsu and the first wife of Nagao Masakage. Aya is best known for her role in events before and after the siege of Otate; she lamented the Uesugi civil war for succession after Kenshin's death and refused to support either heir.

Life 
Aya was the second daughter of Nagao Tamekage. Her mother is believed to have later born Uesugi Kenshin. She had two sons and two daughters by Nagao Masakage: their oldest son in childhood, so their second son, Kagekatsu, was adopted into the Uesugi clan, as reportedly were their daughters. Aya-Gozen moved to Kasugayama Castle in 1564. According to legend, she was a highly intelligent woman and skilled in recognizing talent, being responsible for employing various samurai to work for Kenshin. She recommended Naoe Kanetsugu to serve her son, Kagekatsu. It was rumored that Kanetsugu tried his best to care for her in gratitude.

After Kenshin's death, a dispute arose between Kagekatsu and Kagetora; Aya-Gozen tried to protect Kagetora's heir after the death of her eldest daughter (Kagetora's wife). Although she was with Kagetora, she returned to Kikuhime (Takeda Shigen's daughter and Uesugi Kagekatsu's wife) and Osen no Kata's (Naoe Kanetsugu's wife) care. She died at Yonezawa Castle, and was enshrined at Risen-ji. As for why she was named as such, the reasons are still debated even to this day.

References

1524 births
1609 deaths
16th-century Japanese women
17th-century Japanese women
People of Sengoku-period Japan
Uesugi clan
Japanese Buddhist clergy
16th-century Japanese people
17th-century Japanese people